Roberts Raymond T. Labagala (born July 5, 1984) is a Filipino former professional basketball player. He last played for the Talk 'N Text Tropang Texters of the Philippine Basketball Association (PBA). Standing at 5 feet 7 inches, Labagala plays at the point guard position.

He played collegiate basketball at the University of the East where he was a benchwarmer who played the fewest minutes on the court. Shortly after graduating, he was picked with the 12th overall pick on the second round of the 2010 PBA draft by the Barangay Ginebra Kings. He played short minutes on his rookie season due to the Kings' tight guard rotation. After his rookie season, he end up included in the All-Rookie team and being the Rookie Blitz Game Most Valuable Player.

After three seasons with the Kings that was renamed to San Miguel on the last season of his tenure with the team, he was traded to the Barako Bull Energy for very similar Emman Monfort. As usual on his career, Labagala sat out mostly and played just 3 minutes per game in one season with the Energy. When Labagala's contract expired, he was left unsigned by his team and months later was signed by Talk 'N Text Tropang Texters where he won his first PBA championship.

Personal life and amateur career
Labagala was born on 5 July 1984 on Talisay, Cebu where he was also raised. He studied and played high school basketball at the Cebu Institute of Technology – University Labagala currently resides at Navotas, his wife's hometown where he currently owns a pastry bakeshop named after him, Little Rob's Cake Haus. Labagala is involved in training the youth of Navotas for improvement, he launched his own basketball camp on 2013. Labagala is a Christian. Labagala played collegiate basketball for the University of the East's Red Warriors. Because Labagala spent little time on the court, his chances of being scouted by PBA teams that could bring him to the country's premier league was much smaller. Labagala played the fewest minutes among the Red Warriors but was able to help the team's offensive capabilities through his passing ability and speed.

Professional career

Barangay Ginebra Kings/San Miguel (2010-2014)
Nobody thought that Labagala would set foot on a PBA court. His low playing time during his college years meant he was underrated. Labagala was among the oldest rookies in his class and the least-popular. Fortunately, he was picked with the twelfth overall pick of the 2010 PBA draft by the country's most popular team which is the Barangay Ginebra Kings. Labagala poured in 8 points and 3 assists in his PBA debut in a loss against Alaska. He only played 19 games on his rookie season and poured almost 5 points and one assist per game. On his sophomore year, he played more games and more minutes and his statistics slightly went down to 3.87 in 14 minutes action per game. He helped the team in their playoff run on the 2013 PBA Commissioner's Cup. The Kings went on the finals one-time on his third season where they got swept in a best-of-five series.

PBA career statistics

Correct as of August 1, 2015

Season-by-season averages

|-
| align=left | 
| align=left | Barangay Ginebra
| 19 || 14.1 || .493 || .481 || .533 || .8 || 1.0 || .6 || .1 || 4.7
|-
| align=left | 
| align=left | Barangay Ginebra
| 30 || 14.2 || .429 || .281 || .850 || 1.2 || 1.5 || .2 || .0 || 3.9
|-
| align=left | 
| align=left | Barangay Ginebra
| 29 || 8.5 || .384 || .188 || .500 || .3 || .6 || .2 || .0 || 2.6
|-
| align=left | 
| align=left | Barako Bull
| 9 || 11.3 || .419 || .000 || .250 || 1.1 || 1.1 || .6 || .0 || 3.0
|-
| align=left | 
| align=left | Talk 'N Text
| 8 || 3.6 || .250 || .000 || .500 || .1 || .3 || .0 || .0 || .9

References

Living people
Filipino men's basketball players
UE Red Warriors basketball players
1984 births
Basketball players from Cebu
People from Talisay, Cebu
Point guards
Barangay Ginebra San Miguel players
Barako Bull Energy players
TNT Tropang Giga players
Cebuano people
Barangay Ginebra San Miguel draft picks